The 197th New York State Legislature, consisting of the New York State Senate and the New York State Assembly, met from January 3, 2007, to December 31, 2008, during Eliot Spitzer's and the early part of David Paterson's governorship, in Albany.

State Senate

Senators
The asterisk (*) denotes members of the previous Legislature who continued in office as members of this Legislature. Assemblyman Darrel Aubertine was elected to fill a vacancy in the Senate.

Note: For brevity, the chairmanships omit the words "...the Committee on (the)..."

Employees
 Secretary: ?

State Assembly

Assembly members
The asterisk (*) denotes members of the previous Legislature who continued in office as members of this Legislature.

Note: For brevity, the chairmanships omit the words "...the Committee on (the)..."

Employees
 Clerk: ?

References

Sources
 Senate election results at NYS Board of Elections
 Assembly election results at NYS Board of Elections

197
2007 politics in New York (state)
2008 politics in New York (state)
2007 U.S. legislative sessions
2008 U.S. legislative sessions